Françoise d'Alençon (1490 – 14 September 1550) was the eldest daughter of René of Alençon and Margaret of Lorraine, and the younger sister and despoiled heiress of Charles IV, Duke of Alençon.

The sister and heiress of Charles IV of Alençon, she was despoiled of her heritage by her sister-in-law Marguerite of Angoulême, sister of King Francis I of France. 

Her son Antoine, however, went on to marry Jeanne III of Navarre, born of the second marriage of Marguerite with Henry II of Navarre. The grandson of Françoise and Marguerite, Henry de Bourbon, would become King of France and Navarre.

Family 
In 1505, Françoise married Francis II, Duke of Longueville.  They had 2 children:

 Jacques d'Orléans-Longueville (1511–1512), unmarried
 Renée d'Orléans-Longueville, Countess of Dunois (1508–1515), unmarried

On 18 May 1513, Françoise married, secondly, Charles de Bourbon, Duke of Vendôme.  They had 13 children:

 Louis de Bourbon (1514–1516), unmarried
 Marie de Bourbon (1515–1538), unmarried
 Marguerite de Bourbon (1516–1589), married 1538 Francis I of Cleves, Duke de Nevers (1516–1561)
 Antoine de Bourbon, Duke of Vendôme (1518–1562), married 1548 Jeanne III, Queen of Navarre.
 François de Bourbon, Count of Enghien (1519–1546), unmarried
 Madeleine de Bourbon, Abbess of Sainte Croix de Poitiers (1521–1561), unmarried
 Louis de Bourbon (1522–1525), unmarried
 Charles de Bourbon, Archbishop of Rouen (1523–1590), unmarried
 Catherine de Bourbon, Abbess of Soissons (1525–1594), unmarried
 Renée de Bourbon, Abbess of Chelles (1527–1583), unmarried
 Jean de Bourbon, Count of Soissons and Enghien (1528–1557), married 1557 his first cousin Marie, Duchess of Estouteville (1539–1601)
 Louis de Bourbon, Prince of Condé (7 May 1530 – 13 March 1569), married Eléonore de Roye
 Léonore de Bourbon, Abbess of Fontevraud (1532–1611), unmarried

Ancestors

References

Sources

House of Valois
1490 births
1550 deaths
House of Bourbon
Duchesses of Vendôme
Duchesses of Longueville